The 1990 IAAF Grand Prix Final was the sixth edition of the season-ending competition for the IAAF Grand Prix track and field circuit, organised by the International Association of Athletics Federations. It was held on 7 September at the Olympic Stadium (Athens) in Athens, Greece. Leroy Burrell (100 metres) and Merlene Ottey (200 metres) were the overall points winners of the tournament. This was Ottey's second series win (having previously won in 1987) and made her the second woman to win the honour twice, after Paula Ivan. The number of athletics events in the programme reached eighteen for the first time, with ten for men and eight for women.

Medal summary

Men

Women

Points leaders

Men

Women

References
IAAF Grand Prix Final. GBR Athletics. Retrieved on 2015-01-17.

External links
IAAF Grand Prix Final archive from IAAF

Grand Prix Final
Grand Prix Final
Sports competitions in Athens
20th century in Athens
IAAF Grand Prix Final
International athletics competitions hosted by Greece